Cal Joseph Towey (born February 6, 1990) is an American professional baseball player who is a free agent. He previously played in the Los Angeles Angels of Anaheim and Miami Marlins organizations.

Career
Towey attended Eastside Catholic High School in Sammamish, Washington. He played shortstop for the school's baseball team. Towey was selected by The Seattle Times as First Team All-Metro League in his junior year, and an All-Seattle metropolitan area selection after his senior year.

Coaches for the Baylor Bears baseball team noticed Towey in a tournament in Florida. On their urging, he enrolled at Baylor University to play college baseball for the Bears as a walk-on. He played as a right fielder in his first two years at Baylor, and as a third baseman in his final two years. In 2011, he played collegiate summer baseball with the Hyannis Harbor Hawks of the Cape Cod Baseball League. In 2013, Towey was named the Most Outstanding Player at the Houston College Classic. That year, he was also a Second Team All-Big 12 Conference selection.

After his senior year at Baylor, the Los Angeles Angels of Anaheim selected Towey in the 17th round of the 2013 MLB Draft. He signed and spent 2013 with the Orem Owlz where he batted .317 with eight home runs and 53 RBIs in 70 games. In 2014, he played for the Inland Empire 66ers and batted .279 with ten home runs and 63 RBIs in 128 games. That same season, the Angels also attempted to convert him into a catcher. After the 2014 season, the Angels assigned Towey to the Arizona Fall League. In 2015, he played for the Arkansas Travelers where he compiled a .215 batting average with two home runs and 49 RBIs in 101 games, and in 2016, he played for both Arkansas and the Salt Lake Bees where he slashed a combined .264/.376/.436 with 13 home runs and 49 RBIs in 135 total games.

At the 2016 Winter Meetings, the Miami Marlins selected Towey from the Angels in the minor league phase of the Rule 5 draft. He spent 2017 with both the Jacksonville Jumbo Shrimp and New Orleans Baby Cakes, posting a combined .222 batting average with five home runs and 35 RBIs in 102 total games between the two clubs. He was released from the Marlins organization on March 22, 2018.

On March 30, 2018, Towey signed with the Kansas City T-Bones of the American Association. He was released on March 6, 2019.

Personal life
Towey's father, Curt, and uncle, Steve, both played in Minor League Baseball. Curt coached Cal's team at Eastside Catholic.

References

External links

1990 births
Baseball players from Washington (state)
Baylor Bears baseball players
Hyannis Harbor Hawks players
Orem Owlz players
Inland Empire 66ers of San Bernardino players
Living people
Mesa Solar Sox players
Arkansas Travelers players
People from Sammamish, Washington
Sportspeople from Kirkland, Washington
Salt Lake Bees players
New Orleans Baby Cakes players
Kansas City T-Bones players
Eau Claire Express players